This is a list of all personnel changes for the 2013 Indian Premier League.

Retirement

Trades
The trading window opened on 19 November 2012.

Signings

 Retained players

Released players
In October 2012, teams were offered the option of releasing any number of their players from their contracts ahead of the trading window and auction. This allowed teams to reduce player costs. The following players were released from their contracts.

†Signed as a replacement player for an undisclosed sum

Sunrisers Hyderabad
Tekkami Atchuta Rao
Kedar Devdhar
Ishank Jaggi
Tanmay Mishra
Syed Quadri
Sneha Kishore
Sunny Sohal
Tanmay Srivastava
Arjun Yadav
Chennai Super Kings
Yo Mahesh
Abhinav Mukund
Sudeep Tyagi
K Vasudevadas
G Vignesh
Delhi Daredevils
Prashant Naik
Puneet Bisht
Robin Bist
Sunny Gupta
Kuldeep Raval
Aavishkar Salvi
Vikas Mishra
Tejashwi Yadav
Zafir Patel
Kings XI Punjab
Love Ablish
Amit Yadav
Paras Dogra
Vikramjeet Malik
Abhishek Nayar
Nitin Saini
Kolkata Knight Riders
Chirag Jani
Sanju Samson
Iresh Saxena
Jaydev Unadkat
Mumbai Indians
Sujit Nayak
Jaydev Shah
Pune Warriors India
Kamran Khan
Harshad Khadiwale
Mohnish Mishra
Sachin Rana
Rajasthan Royals
Deepak Chahar
Aakash Chopra
Aditya Dole
Samad Fallah
Faiz Fazal
Sumit Narwal
Pankaj Singh
Amit Paunikar
Abhishek Raut
Pinal Shah
Amit Singh
Dishant Yagnik
Royal Challengers Bangalore
Raju Bhatkal
CM Gautam
Abrar Kazi
Ryan Ninan
Asad Pathan
S Thiyagarajan
Prasanth Parameswaran

Withdrawn players
The following players withdrew from the tournament.

Auction

The players' auction for the 2013 season was held on 3 February in Chennai. The Nottinghamshire County Cricket Club prevented their players (Michael Lumb, Alex Hales and Samit Patel in particular) from participating in the IPL and the auction to avoid losing them for the County Championship.

Sold players
All player contracts are for this season only.

Players list

First tier ($400,000):

  Michael Clarke
  Ricky Ponting

Second tier ($300,000):
  Johan Botha

Third tier ($200,000):

  Manpreet Gony
  Aaron Finch
  Matthew Wade
  Glenn Maxwell
  Doug Bollinger
  Dirk Nannes
  John Hastings
  Herschelle Gibbs
  Matt Prior

Fourth tier ($100,000):
Capped:

  R. P. Singh
  Abhishek Nayar
  Sudeep Tyagi
  Jaydev Unadkat
  Upul Tharanga
  Dinesh Chandimal
  Rangana Herath
  Thilan Samaraweera
  Dilhara Fernando
  Phillip Hughes
  Adam Voges
  Daniel Christian
  James Faulkner
  Moisés Henriques
  James Hopes
  Stephen O'Keefe
  Callum Ferguson
  Josh Hazlewood
  Clinton McKay
  Kane Richardson
  Tim Paine
  Travis Birt
  Vernon Philander
  Nathan McCullum
  Scott Styris
  Martin Guptill
  Jesse Ryder
  Darren Bravo
  Darren Sammy
  Fidel Edwards
  Ravi Bopara

Uncapped:

  Ben Cutting
  Nic Maddinson
  Nathan Coulter-Nile

Fifth tier ($50,000):
Capped:

  Pankaj Singh
  Wasim Jaffer
  Ajantha Mendis
  Suraj Randiv
  Prasanna Jayawardene
  Thisara Perera
  Farveez Maharoof
  Jeevan Mendis
  Sachithra Senanayake
  Tharanga Paranavitana
  Dilruwan Perera
  Dhammika Prasad
  Chanaka Welegedara
  Luke Pomersbach
  Trent Copeland
  Ryan McLaren
  Richard Levi
  Rory Kleinveldt
  Jacob Oram
  Denesh Ramdin
  Ravi Rampaul
  Devendra Bishoo
  Ricardo Powell
  Kieran Powell
  Tino Best
  Jerome Taylor
  Christopher Barnwell

Uncapped:

  Joe Burns
  Daniel Harris
  Ben Rohrer
  Alister McDermott
  Kevin O'Brien

Sixth tier ($20,000):
Capped:

  Kaushal Silva
  Akila Dananjaya
  Chamara Kapugedera
  Jehan Mubarak
  Lahiru Thirimanne
  Seekkuge Prasanna
  Shaminda Eranga
  Dilshan Munaweera
  Nuwan Pradeep
  Ben Laughlin
  Dane Vilas
  Paul Harris
  Lonwabo Tsotsobe
  Charl Langeveldt
  Veerasammy Permaul
  Danza Hyatt

Uncapped:

  Kusal Perera
  Cameron Boyce
  Quinton de Kock
  Aaron Phangiso
  Chris Morris
  Henry Davids
  Rilee Rossouw
  Jandre Coetzee
  Alistair Gray
  Dwaine Pretorius
  Stiaan van Zyl
  David Wiese
  Andrew Birch
  Jason Holder

References

External links
 IPL 2013 player salary

Personnel changes
Indian Premier League personnel changes
Cricket player auction lists